The state of Wisconsin is covered by the following area codes:

 Area code 262 covers the southeastern part of the state including Waukesha, Racine and Kenosha, except for Milwaukee County and several outlying areas covered by Milwaukee County-based exchanges.
Area code 274 is reserved to overlay 920 on a date to be determined.
 Area code 414 covers Milwaukee County and several outlying areas covered by Milwaukee County-based exchanges.
 Area codes 353 and 608 covers southwestern Wisconsin, including Madison.
 Area codes 715 and 534 cover northern Wisconsin, including Superior, Eau Claire and Wausau.
 Area code 920 covers eastern Wisconsin including Green Bay, the Fox Cities, Manitowoc and Sheboygan.

References

Communications in Wisconsin
 
Wisconsin
Area codes